Linus Ullmark (born 31 July 1993) is a Swedish professional ice hockey goaltender for the Boston Bruins of the National Hockey League (NHL). He was selected by the Buffalo Sabres in the sixth round, 163rd overall, of the 2012 NHL Entry Draft.

Playing career

Buffalo Sabres
On 27 May 2014, Ullmark was signed by the Buffalo Sabres to a three-year, entry-level contract. He was returned on loan to Modo Hockey of the Swedish Hockey League (SHL) for the 2014–15 season.

In his first season in North America, Ullmark attended the Sabres' training camp. After recovery from an early injury, he was assigned to begin the 2015–16 season with the Rochester Americans of the American Hockey League (AHL). Ullmark played in three games before being recalled to the Sabres on 23 October 2015. He made his NHL debut the following day, making 24 saves in a 4–3 defeat to the New Jersey Devils. His first victory came in his second start, a 3–1 win over the Philadelphia Flyers.

Ullmark would spend majority of the subsequent season with the Americans, amassing a record of 26–27–2. He appeared in one game for the Sabres, falling 4–2 to the Tampa Bay Lightning. On 13 June 2017, the Sabres re-signed Ullmark to a two-year, $1.5 million contract with an annual average of $750,000.

Ullmark joined the Sabres full-time during the 2018–19 season. In his season debut on 13 October, he recorded his first career NHL shutout, stopping all 36 shots faced in a 3–0 win over the Arizona Coyotes. On 22 December, Ullmark stopped all 40 shots faced to shut out the Anaheim Ducks 3–0. Overall, he recorded a 15–14–5 record in 37 games while backing up Carter Hutton.

On 3 August 2019, the Sabres re-signed Ullmark to a one-year, $1.325 million. On 25 October 2020, Ullmark signed a one-year, $2.6 million contract with the Sabres.

Boston Bruins
On 28 July 2021, Ullmark left the Sabres as a free agent and signed a four-year, $20 million contract to be the starting goaltender with the Boston Bruins. Ullmark played his first regular season game for the Bruins on 22 October 2021, a 4–1 win against the Sabres.

On 5 January 2023, Ullmark was elected as one of three Boston Bruins representatives to the 2023 NHL All–Star Weekend, joining head coach Jim Montgomery and teammate David Pastrňák. On 19 January, Ullmark notched his 100th career win, saving 25 of 26 shots against the New York Islanders. On 25 February, Ullmark became the 13th NHL goaltender to score a goal, and the first since Pekka Rinne in 2020, as he shot the puck directly into the Vancouver Canucks' empty net with less than one minute remaining in the Bruins' 3–1 win.

Personal life
Ullmark is a fan of esports, and of Dota 2 in particular. On 18 March 2019, he appeared on a Dota 2 podcast where he discussed the differences between playing Dota and ice hockey, as well as comparisons between the professional scenes of competitive gaming and traditional sports.

Career statistics

Regular season and playoffs

International

Honours and awards

References

External links
 

1993 births
Living people
Boston Bruins players
Buffalo Sabres draft picks
Buffalo Sabres players
Modo Hockey players
Mora IK players
National Hockey League goaltenders who have scored in a game
People from Kramfors Municipality
Rochester Americans players
Sportspeople from Västernorrland County
Swedish expatriate ice hockey players in the United States
Swedish ice hockey goaltenders